Nils Ove König (25 June 1950 – 23 July 2020) was a Swedish speed skater. He won a silver medal at the 1971 World Sprint Championships and finished seventh in the 500 m event at the 1972 Winter Olympics.

References

External links
 
 

1950 births
2020 deaths
Swedish male speed skaters
Olympic speed skaters of Sweden
Speed skaters at the 1972 Winter Olympics
People from Askersund Municipality
World Sprint Speed Skating Championships medalists
Sportspeople from Örebro County
20th-century Swedish people